Boat Encampment is a ghost town in the East Kootenay region of southeastern British Columbia. The locality was at the tip of the Big Bend on the north shore of the Columbia River.

Precise location
The consensus places the initial location between the mouths of the Canoe and Wood rivers. After the highway was opened, the bridge location assumed the name and was chosen for viewing purposes as the site for the 1953 cairn and plaque. A fishing lodge opened in the vicinity. In 1943, the area was designated a National Historic Site of Canada. In 1973, the historic marker was relocated when the enlarged Kinbasket Lake formed the Mica Dam reservoir. In 2000, a memorial plaque was placed at a visitor site on the south shore of the Columbia.

Early significance
When David Thompson of the fur trading North West Company (NWC) attempted his usual westward crossing of the Continental Divide via the Howse Pass in September 1810, the hostile Piegan Blackfeet blocked his passage, forcing his party to divert northward to the uncharted Athabasca Pass. After a tortuous journey, the party reached the Boat Encampment site in January, 1811. Four discontented members deserted. The remainder continued upstream on the Columbia, but further discontent prompted a return to Boat Encampment, where they built a cabin for the winter. During his stay, Thompson built a canoe, naming the adjacent waterway the Canoe River. They split cedar into thin boards because the preferred birch bark lacked thickness. In the spring, they proceeded up the Columbia on their journey to the coast. Within a few years, Athabasca Pass became the accepted route for the fur brigades. In 1821, when the NWC merged into the Hudson's Bay Company (HBC), the latter adopted the route for the once or twice-annual HBC "Express" linking the west with Hudson Bay.

The Athabasca trail northeastward from Boat Encampment comprised Wood River, Jeffrey Creek, Pacific Creek, Committee's Punch Bowl, Athabasca Pass, Whirlpool River, Athabasca River, Brûlé Lake, and terminated at Jasper House (first location). Gradually, the eastern terminus moved westward, having a final location in the vicinity of Henry House. Cabins, stables and a boathouse existed at Boat Encampment. Each eastbound party would exchange boats for horses and snowshoes with each westbound one. However, the former would wait up to a month for the latter to arrive. On one occasion, having waited 39 days, the eastbound were about to return back down the river, when word was received of the westbound imminent arrival. After 1849, the route and site were largely abandoned when the HBC switched to the Tête Jaune Cache route via the Fraser River.

Name origin
Earlier names were Canoe camp, Portage Point, Rocky Mountain Portage, and Mountain House.

The rename to Boat Encampment (often not capitalised and/or with the definite article) appears to have been adopted in the 1830s.

By 1900, the place was also known as Big Bend, but this term also had a wider application.

The pass was also called Rocky Mountain Portage, Columbia Pass, or Boat Encampment Pass.

Notable early visitors
1825: Governor George Simpson.

1827, 1828: Francis Ermatinger.

1828: David Douglas.

1838: Fathers Blanchet and Demers held the first mass on the mainland of what would become BC.

1845: Lieutenant Henry Warre made sketches during his travels.

1846, 1847: Paul Kane also made sketches. Paintings later developed from his drawings exaggerated the landscape.

Ferry and bridge

The ferry installed in 1900 no longer operated a few years later. A subsidized ferry was established in 1910 to connect the Big Bend with Tête Jaune via the Canoe River shore. The ferry, which could carry horses and wagons, existed at least until 1916.

The highway bridge was erected by 1936. Although completed in late 1939, the official opening ceremony for the highway was held at the Boat Encampment bridge in June 1940. By 1973, when the dam submerged the locality, the highway had fallen into general disuse. During 1970–71, an over-height loaded logging truck damaged the bridge bracing. Once repaired, warning portals were installed on the approaches.

Images
Former highway bridge, Boat Encampment, 1959.
Former general store/BA gas bar, Boat Encampment, 1959.

Footnotes

References

Ghost towns in British Columbia
Fur trade
Pre-Confederation British Columbia
Hudson's Bay Company
Columbia Country
Heritage sites in British Columbia
National Historic Sites in British Columbia